Leonard Nienhuis (born 16 March 1990) is a former Dutch footballer who played as a goalkeeper. He formerly played for FC Groningen, SC Veendam and SC Cambuur.

International career
Nienhuis is a one-time youth international for the Netherlands national under-21 football team on 17 November 2010.

Honours

Club
SC Cambuur
Eerste Divisie (1): 2012–13

References

External links
 Voetbal International profile 

1990 births
Living people
Dutch footballers
Netherlands youth international footballers
Association football goalkeepers
FC Groningen players
SC Veendam players
SC Cambuur players
Sparta Rotterdam players
Eredivisie players
Eerste Divisie players
Footballers from Groningen (city)